Akan Volcanic Complex is a volcanic group of volcanoes that grew out of the Akan caldera. It is located within Akan National Park, about 50 km Northwest of Kushiro in eastern Hokkaidō, Japan.

Description
A number of peaks are arranged around therim of Lake Akan ( Akan-ko), which fills a 24×13 km caldera, the tallest being Me-Akan (Meakan), O-Akan (Oakan) and Akan-Fuji.

Oakan is prominently located at the Northeast side of the caldera, while Meakan occupies the opposite, Southwest side, in a cluster of nine stratovolcanoes that include Akan-Fuji, one of many symmetrical Japanese volcanoes named after the renowned Mount Fuji, and Fuppushi volcano (a.k.a. Fuppushi-dake, not to be confused with Mount Fuppushi, which is located in Southwestern Hokkaido).

Volcanology
The Akan caldera was formed 31,500 years ago. Its elongated shape is due to its incremental formation during major explosive eruptions, from the early to the mid-Pleistocene periods.

The Nakamachineshiri crater of Meakan volcano was formed during a major eruption about 13,500 years ago.

The Me-Akan group of nine overlapping cones on the eastern side of Lake Akan has had mild eruptions since the beginning of the 19th century. The last eruption of this historical volcano was in 2008.

Oakan, Meakan, Furebetsu and Fuppushi are the major post-caldera volcanoes of the Akan volcanic complex.

Me-Akan is one of the most active volcanoes of Hokkaido. Its summit contains the active craters of Ponmachineshiri and Naka-Machineshiri, sites of frequent phreatic eruptions in historical time. Akan-Fuji and O-Akan have not erupted in historical time.

Akan is rated with a volcanic explosivity index of 4 on the Smithsonian VEI scale, the scale's fourth-highest score, based on the volcano's largest known eruption, around 7050 BC.

Following are prominent features of Akan:

Cones
Me-Akan-Dake (Mount Meakan) (1499 m) Stratovolcano
Akan Fuji (Akan-Fuji, Akan-Huji) (1476 m) Stratovolcano
Kita-Yama (1400 m)  Cone
O-Akan-Dake (Mount Oakan) (1371 m) Stratovolcano
Kenga-Mine Cone 1336 m
Nishi-Yama (Nisi-Yama) (1300 m) Cone
Fuppushi (Huppusi) (1226 m) Stratovolcano
Miname-Dake (1217 m) Stratovolcano
Higashi-Dake (Higasi-Dake) (1140 m) Cone
Furebetsu (Hurebetu) (1098 m) Stratovolcano
Kobu-Yama Cone
Futatsu-Dake Pyroclastic cone

Craters
Nakamachineshiri (Nakamatineshiri) Crater
Ponmachineshiri (Ponmatinesiri) Crater

Thermal features
Akan-Kohan Thermal Feature

Other peaks
 Mount Ken
 Mount Ahoro

References

External links

 Akan Caldera - Geological Survey of Japan

Volcanoes of Hokkaido
Volcanic groups
Pleistocene calderas
Calderas of Hokkaido